Sir William Cope PC (died 7 April 1513) was an English courtier who was Cofferer to Henry VII. 

He was born into the well-to-do Cope family of Oxfordshire. In addition to the lands he inherited from his family he also acquired more estates, particularly that of Hanwell around 1500, which became the family seat for many generations.

He served as Cofferer of the Household of Henry VII from 1494 to 1505. Cope was a member of the Privy Council. In the absence at that time of a Treasurer of the Household he carried out the duties of that office as well. In 1498 he was granted the Lordships of Wormleighton and Fenny Compton, part of the lands of Simon de Montford who had been attainted in 1495. He later sold the lands to the Spencer family, later of Althorp.

He was made Keeper of Portchester Castle in 1509.

He died in 1513 and was laid to rest in Banbury church. He had married twice. He firstly married Agnes, the daughter and coheiress of Sir Robert Harcourt of Stanton Harcourt, Oxfordshire, with whom he had a son, Stephen, who also became a courtier. He secondly married Jane, the daughter and coheiress of Sir John Spencer of Hodnell, Warwickshire. With the latter he had three sons, Anthony, William and John.

References

People from Oxfordshire
1513 deaths
English courtiers
Knights Bachelor
Court of Henry VIII